James F. Reynolds (13 January 1919 – 25 August 2003) was an American businessman, musician and pastor. He is best known for starting one of the first commercial cable TV systems in the United States.

Biography
Born in Sandy Lake, Pennsylvania to Myron M. and Faye Moore Reynolds, he began his first TV-related business, Reynolds TV & Appliance Store, in Sandy Lake shortly after graduating from high school. Seeking to expand his customer base, Reynolds emulated the "pipe TV" system (first introduced by BBC Television in 1932) by creating the Reynolds TV Cable subscription service in the late 1940s in Mapledale, Pennsylvania.

Originally, this system was ideal for those living in mountainous or remote regions like Mapledale where broadcast signals were not readily available. But it experienced even greater demand during the Federal Communications Commission's television licensing freeze from 1948-1952, when only those holding government issued permits were allowed to own and operate over-the-air antennae. Essentially, Reynolds would run coaxial cable from his licensed antenna to subscribers' homes for a connection fee, then charge a monthly fee for continued service.

Reynolds's system became so popular by the late 1940s that Reynolds expanded services to nearby Sandy Lake, Stoneboro, Cochranton, Utica and Polk. He did not, however, patent the concept, and as a result, several other entrepreneurs, including John Walson (who installed a similar system in or around the same time as Reynolds) and Robert Tarlton, were able to create their own Community Access Television companies. In fact, Walson has been officially recognized as the inventor of cable TV by the United States Congress and by the National Cable Television Association.

Still, Reynolds's work did not go unnoticed, and for many years after his initial contribution to TV history he served as a consultant to other cable TV providers. His own business passed to his son Rick Reynolds, who incorporated the company as Reynolds TV Cable Inc. in 1975 and later sold it on behalf of the Reynolds family.

References

1919 births
2003 deaths
20th-century American businesspeople